Scelodonta turneri is a species of leaf beetle from Kenya and the Democratic Republic of the Congo. It was first described by Gilbert Ernest Bryant in 1952.

References

Eumolpinae
Beetles of the Democratic Republic of the Congo
Beetles described in 1952
Insects of Kenya